Corps Rhenania Tübingen is a German fraternity and member of the Kösener Senioren-Convents-Verband (KSCV), which is among the oldest fraternity associations. The Corps commits itself to a traditional kind of sport called academic fencing. It associates students and graduates of the University of Tübingen. Its members are called “Tübingen Rhenanians”.

Colors
Members wear a ribbon around their chest colored in blue-white-red as a sign of their early members' origin in combination with a blue hat. The Corps' motto is “Omnes pro uno et unus pro omnibus!” (Lat.: All for one and one for all) as well as “Concordia firmat fortes! (Lat.: unity strengthens the strong).

History

Corps Rhenania was founded on the 7th of July 1827. The first constitution of the fraternity has been reported about in 1834. In 1857, it was granted admission to the KSCV, a nationwide association of Corps in Germany and Austria that had been founded just a few years earlier.

The Corps resides in a mansion that was the first to be built and dedicated to accommodate a fraternity. In the 19th century, fraternities usually assembled in local taverns where they were subject to their host's moods and becoming independent represented a novelty to the contemporary scene.
The house is located on the top of many hills guarding the old market of Tuebingen, called Osterberg. Built in 1892, it saw two more extensions to meet the demands of a flourishing fraternity community. The last extension shaped the façade as it looks today.

The Corps mourned many dead and wounded during World War I, but rising Nazi influence forced its members to shut down public membership activities to subsist clandestinely under false pretenses from 1938. After World War II was over, it was not until 1949 that the Corps reopened. Still, the house was occupied by French troops and was officially handed over in 1954. Renovations of the interior restored its traditional furniture.

Within the above-mentioned KSCV the Corps belongs to a circle that devotes itself to the blue principle. This principle is also termed social principle and comprises the promotion of gentlemanly conduct and social behaviour in general.

Members

Karl Ebermaier, Imperial governor to Cameroon 1912-1916
Klaus Esser, former CEO of Mannesmann
Gerhard Gaul, politician in Schleswig-Holstein
Gottwalt Christian Hirsch, cell biologist
Fritz Lindenmaier, senator president to the Bundesgerichtshof
Ernst Mutschler, pharmacologist
Gisbert Poensgen, retired ambassador of Germany to the European Community 1979-1985
Ernst von Richter, DVP-politician in Prussia
Manfred Schmidt, former CEO and supervisory board chairman of Philips GmbH
Franz Wieacker, legal historian and romanist; decorated with the medal Pour le Mérite
Joachim Zahn, former CEO of Daimler-Chrysler
Johannes Zahn, coproprietor of the bank subdivision HSBC Trinkaus & Burkhardt AG, board member of the World Bank
Alfred-Maurice de Zayas, expert on international law, former President of the Swiss Chapters of International PEN

External links

Corps Rhenania Tübingen (German,  English  and Spanish )

Rhenania Tubingen, Corps
1827 establishments in Germany
Organisations based in Tübingen
Student organizations established in 1827